Trouble in Mind is a George Jones album released on the United Artists label in 1966. "Trouble in Mind" and "Worried Mind" had previously been released on the LP George Jones Sings Bob Wills in 1962, while "I Heard You Crying in Your Sleep" and "Take These Chains from My Heart" were included on My Favorites of Hank Williams, also released in 1962. George Bedard of AllMusic wrote: "One of his best albums, there are sappy vocal choruses on some of the tunes, but they can't diminish George Jones. A few that don't - 'You Done Me Wrong' (written by him) and 'It's a Sin' - are among the best things he's ever recorded."

Track listing
"Trouble in Mind" (Richard M. Jones)
"You Done Me Wrong" (George Jones/Ray Price)
"It's a Sin" (Fred Rose/Zeb Turner)
"My Tears Are Overdue" (Freddie Hart)
"Brown to Blue" (G. Jones)
"Lonesome Old Town" (G. Jones)
"Worried Mind" (Daffan/Davis)
"I Heard You Crying in Your Sleep (Hank Williams)
"Sometimes You Just Can't Win" (Smokey Stover)
"Little Bitty Tears" (Hank Locklin)
"Take These Chains from My Heart" (Fred Rose/Hy Heath)
"Lonesome Life" (G. Jones/George Riddle)

References

1962 albums
George Jones albums